Cramb is a Scottish surname. Notable people with this surname include:

 Colin Cramb (born 1974), Scottish football player and coach
 Fay Cramb, also known as Valmae beck, involved in the murder of Sian Kingi
 John Adam Cramb (1862–1913), Scottish historian
 Richard Cramb (born 1963), Scottish rugby union player